Structures from Silence is the third studio album by American ambient musician Steve Roach. It was released in 1984 on Fortuna.

Recording
The title track, Structures from Silence, took Steve Roach a few months to compose.  He would play the song using an Oberheim OB-8 and Oberheim DSX sequencer day and night, adjusting it until it sounded right to him.  Finally, he went to a recording studio and recorded the song in a single 30-minute long pass, using his own gear along with a second OB-8 as well as a Lexicon 224 digital reverberator.

Release
A remastered version of this album, with a different cover, was released in 2001 by Projekt.

A 30-year anniversary edition was released by Projekt in 2014. The album was remastered in 24-bit/96 kHz from the original analog mixes. There is both a single-CD edition, and a 3-CD deluxe edition that includes two bonus discs created in 2013. Both editions use the original cover art. The remastered original album (but not the two bonus discs) was made available as 24-bit/96 kHz digital downloads.

Video release
In 1987 a VHS video titled Structures from Silence was released. It featured imagery created by Marianne Dolan set to the album's title track. This video was also released on laserdisc under the title Space Dreaming.

Reception

In late November 2014, Steve Roach was selected as Echoes Radio's #1 Artist and Structures from Silence was voted as the #2 album.

Fact listed Structures from Silence as the tenth best album of the 1980s, calling it a "thoughtful, slow-paced study in synthesizer" and one of the important ambient albums of all time. They listed the 2014 reissue as the fourth best reissue that year, commenting that "it's a perfect time to return to this classic album – still spellbinding, three decades on." In 2016, Pitchfork listed it as the 33rd best ambient album of all time.

Track listing

30th anniversary bonus discs

Personnel
Per liner notes.
 Steve Roach — performer, producer, recording engineer
 Michael Stearns — spatial enhancements
 Kevin Braheny — spatial enhancements
 Richard Bailey — cover art

References

1984 albums
Steve Roach (musician) albums
Projekt Records albums
Space music albums by American artists